Rickey Sayers (born February 9, 1990) is a former footballer. Born in Canada, he represented Grenada internationally.

Playing career 
Sayers played in the Canadian Soccer League in 2013 with York Region Shooters B in the Second Division. In 2015, he played in League1 Ontario with ProStars FC. In 2017, he played abroad in the Verbandsliga Hessen-Süd with 1. FCA Darmstadt.

International career 
Sayers made his debut for the Grenada national football team on October 24, 2017, against Panama in a friendly match. He made his second appearance on November 12, 2017, against Trinidad and Tobago.

References 

1990 births
Living people
Association football midfielders
Canadian Soccer League (1998–present) players
Grenadian footballers
Grenada international footballers
Soccer players from Toronto
York Region Shooters players